Ian Macrae Hamish Wilson (2 July 1901 in Hampstead, London – December 1987 in Exeter, Devon) was an English small role actor who appeared in over 145 films during his career. Most were small uncredited roles often playing meek public servants, professional men or busy bodies. Film appearances included The Plank 1967, The Day of the Triffids 1962, Carry On Jack 1963, Two-Way Stretch 1960, Hell Drivers 1957, The Ugly Duckling 1959 and Rotten to the Core 1965. His first film appearance was in the silent A Master of Craft in 1922, and his last was in The Wicker Man in 1973. Several of his films were made by the Boulting brothers, who considered him a "good luck charm."
Wilson died in December 1987 in Devon.

Selected filmography

 A Master of Craft (1922)
 Through Fire and Water (1923) - Jimmy
 The Fighting Gladiator (1926) - J.C. Heenan
 Wait and See (1928) - Caddie
 Shooting Stars (1928) - Reporter
 What Next? (1928) - Wilson
 The Broken Melody (1929) - (uncredited)
 Would You Believe It! (1929) - Restaurant customer
 The Dizzy Limit (1930) - Callboy
 The Woman from China (1930) - Cabin boy
 Bed and Breakfast (1930) - Theodore (uncredited)
 Third Time Lucky (1931) - (uncredited)
 Sally in Our Alley (1931) - Boy Delivering Fish (uncredited)
 Splinters in the Navy (1931) - Call Boy
 Out of the Blue (1931) - Man in Leopard Skin (uncredited)
 Heroes of the Mine (1932) - Ponyboy (uncredited)
 His Lordship (1932) - Man Listening to the Speech (uncredited)
 Little Waitress (1932)
 Soldiers of the King (1933) - Customer at Coffee Stall (uncredited)
 Lucky Blaze (1933)
 Facing the Music (1933) - (uncredited)
 Britannia of Billingsgate (1933) - (uncredited)
 Love, Life and Laughter (1934) - (uncredited)
 The Unholy Quest (1934) - Wilky
 Those Were the Days (1934) - Tom Richardson (uncredited)
 Song at Eventide (1934)
 The Broken Rosary (1934) - Hodge
 City of Beautiful Nonsense (1935) - Extra (uncredited)
 Joy Ride (1935) - Tommy (uncredited)
 The Love Test (1935) - Chemist
 Birds of a Feather (1935) - Peter
 Play Up the Band (1935) - Rowland
 Father O'Flynn (1935)
 Things Are Looking Up (1935) - Drummer in Band (uncredited)
 Melody of My Heart (1936)
 Love in Exile (1936) - Bespectacled Man in Palace Kitchen (uncredited)
 Song of the Forge (1937) - Albert Meek
 The Vicar of Bray (1937) - (uncredited)
 Inquest (1939) - Jury Member (uncredited)
 Let George Do It! (1940) - Parker - Dinky Do (uncredited)
 Love on the Dole (1941) - Man at Demonstration (uncredited)
 Quiet Wedding (1941) - Bookstall Customer (uncredited)
 Atlantic Ferry (1941) - Extra (uncredited)
 We Dive at Dawn (1943) - Cigarette Customer (uncredited)
 The Dummy Talks (1943) - (uncredited)
 My Learned Friend (1943) - Stagehand (uncredited)
 The Demi-Paradise (1943) - Army Bandmaster (uncredited)
 The Volunteer (1944) - Carpenter (uncredited)
 The Hundred Pound Window (1944) - Mike - Reporter (uncredited)
 Don't Take It to Heart (1944) - Reporter in Court (uncredited)
 The Agitator (1945) - Office Worker (uncredited)
 Beware of Pity (1946) - Minor Role (uncredited)
 The Hills of Donegal (1947) - Stage Manager (uncredited)
 The Mark of Cain (1947) - Extra (uncredited)
 Vice Versa (1948) - Jury Foreman (uncredited)
 My Sister and I (1948) - Horsnell
 Bond Street (1948) - Extra (uncredited)
 It's Hard to Be Good (1948) - Fighting Neighbour (uncredited)
 The History of Mr. Polly (1949) - Mr. Clamp (uncredited)
 Marry Me! (1949) - Minor Role (uncredited)
 Trottie True (1949) - Bert (uncredited)
 The Lady Craved Excitement (1950) - Mugsy
 Seven Days to Noon (1950) - Sandwich-Board Man (uncredited)
 High Treason (1951) - Glass Collector (uncredited)
 The Magic Box (1951) - Minor Role (uncredited)
 The Last Page (1952) - Mushroom Book Customer (uncredited)
 Whispering Smith Hits London (1952) - Small Tough
 Treasure Hunt (1952) - (uncredited)
 Mother Riley Meets the Vampire (1952) - Hitchcock - the butler
 Meet Me Tonight (1952) - Call Boy (segment "Red Peppers")
 Miss Robin Hood (1952) - (uncredited)
 The Floating Dutchman (1952) - Herring (uncredited)
 Hindle Wakes (1952) - Mr. Slaughter
 The Flanagan Boy (1953) - Audience Member with Thick Glasses (uncredited)
 Sailor of the King (1953) - Waiter (uncredited)
 The Saint's Girl Friday (1953) - Man Waiting for Telephone Booth (uncredited)
 Trouble in Store (1953) - Onlooker (uncredited)
 The Million Pound Note (1954) - Photographer (uncredited)
 Seagulls Over Sorrento (1954) - Extra (uncredited)
 Up to His Neck (1954) - Friday's Husband (uncredited)
 Time Is My Enemy (1954) - (uncredited)
 Radio Cab Murder (1954) - Second Bank Nighwatchman (uncredited)
 One Good Turn (1955) - Number 14 (uncredited)
 The Brain Machine (1955) - Personnel Manager
 The Glass Cage (1955) - Man Eating Sandwich (uncredited)
 See How They Run (1955) - Extra (uncredited)
 Miss Tulip Stays the Night (1955) - Police Photographer
 Value for Money (1955) - Extra (uncredited)
 One Way Out (1955) - Music Shop Customer (uncredited)
 The Adventures of Quentin Durward (1955) - Hunchback (uncredited)
 Man of the Moment (1955) - Extra (uncredited)
 Portrait of Alison (1955) - Dorking's Customer (uncredited)
 Private's Progress (1956) - Party Guest (uncredited)
 Jumping for Joy (1956) - Man in Phone Box During Fight (uncredited)
 Invitation to the Dance (1956) - Man Exiting Stage Door in 'Ring Around the Rosy' (uncredited)
 A Touch of the Sun (1956) - Ministry of Health Official (uncredited)
 Hra o zivot (1956)
 My Wife's Family (1956) - (uncredited)
 Stars in Your Eyes (1956) - Man on Stairwell (uncredited)
 Up in the World (1956) - Man in Queue (uncredited)
 The Big Money (1956) - Post Office Clerk (uncredited)
 Brothers in Law (1957) - Undertaker's Assistant
 The Good Companions (1957) - Mr. Droke
 Kill Me Tomorrow (1957) - Marty
 The Key Man (1957) - Process Server
 How to Murder a Rich Uncle (1957) - Postman
 Hell Drivers (1957) - Gibson, Hawlett Paymaster (uncredited)
 Lucky Jim (1957) - Glee Singer
 Just My Luck (1957) - 2nd Gas Man (uncredited)
 Morning Call (1957) - Herbert (uncredited)
 Rx Murder (1958) - Extra (uncredited)
 Happy Is the Bride (1958) - Umpire
 The Square Peg (1958) - Extra (uncredited)
 Carlton-Browne of the F.O. (1959) - Onlooker (uncredited)
 Idol on Parade (1959) - Man in Cinema (uncredited)
 The Ugly Duckling (1959) - Small Man
 I'm All Right Jack (1959) - Evangelist
 A Woman's Temptation (1959) - (uncredited)
 Top Floor Girl (1959) - (uncredited)
 Suddenly, Last Summer (1959) - A Patient (uncredited)
 Two Way Stretch (1960) - Milkman
 Carry On Constable (1960) - (uncredited)
 A French Mistress (1960) - (uncredited)
 Suspect (1960) - Pin Table Man
 Feet of Clay (1961) - Signwriter
 Carry On Regardless (1961) - Advertising Man (uncredited)
 Raising the Wind (1961) - Street Musician - Drummer
 Postman's Knock (1962)
 Carry On Cruising (1962) - Passenger (uncredited)
 Two and Two Make Six (1962) - Sevenhills City Council Official (uncredited)
 The Phantom of the Opera (1962) - Phantom's Lackey
 The Day of the Triffids (1962) - Greenhouse Watchman
 The Boys (1962) - (uncredited)
 The Iron Maiden (1962) - Sidney Webb
 Heavens Above! (1963) - Salvation Army Major
 Carry On Cabby (1963) - Man in Cab
 West 11 (1963) - Man on Stairs (uncredited)
 Carry On Jack (1963) - Old Carrier
 Carry On Cleo (1964) - Small Messenger
 San Ferry Ann (1965) - (uncredited)
 Rotten to the Core (1965) - Chopper Parsons
 Help! (1965) - Power Station Man (uncredited)
 The Sandwich Man (1966) - (uncredited)
 Casino Royale (1967) - British Army Officer (uncredited)
 The Plank (1967) - Driver's Mate
 Tell Me Lies (1968)
 Oh! What a Lovely War (1969) - Salvation Army (uncredited)
 The Wicker Man (1973) - Communicant (final film role)

References

External links

1901 births
1987 deaths
English male film actors
English male television actors
Male actors from London
20th-century English male actors